Welcome Aboard is an American variety show that was televised live on Sundays at 7:30pm EST on NBC. The series was initially titled Admiral Presents the Five Star Revue—Welcome Aboard, when it was sponsored by Admiral but was retitled when sponsorship was dropped in December 1948.

The premiere episode featured Martin and Lewis (after their June 20, 1948 appearance on The Ed Sullivan Show), and Phil Silvers. The second episode on October 10 also featured Martin and Lewis, and a kinescope of this latter show is preserved in the UCLA Film and Television Archive. Three additional episodes are held by the Library of Congress

See also
1948-49 United States network television schedule

References

External links
 

1948 American television series debuts
1949 American television series endings
1940s American variety television series
Black-and-white American television shows
English-language television shows
NBC original programming